Ray Steele may refer to:

 Peter Sauer (1900–1949), used the ring name while wrestling in America
 Ray Steele (The Bill), a fictional character in the TV series The Bill played from 1993-1996
 Ray Steele (wrestler), wrestler based in the United Kingdom
 Raymond Steele, Australian footballer, cricketer and administrator